Yevgeny Semyonovich Kadyaykin (15 August 1928 – 5 March 2021) was a Soviet middle-distance runner. He competed in the men's 3000 metres steeplechase at the 1956 Summer Olympics.

References

1928 births
2021 deaths
Athletes (track and field) at the 1956 Summer Olympics
Soviet male middle-distance runners
Soviet male steeplechase runners
Olympic athletes of the Soviet Union
Sportspeople from Penza